Venceslav Simonovski (born 29 September 1962) is a former Macedonian footballer.

Club career
Born in Delčevo, SR Macedonia, back then within Yugoslavia, Simonovski played with Macedonian side FK Vardar in the Yugoslav First League between 1983 and 1988, and with Serbian side FK Spartak Subotica between 1988 and 1992.

References

External links
 
 

1962 births
Living people
People from Delčevo
Macedonian footballers
Association football defenders
FK Vardar players
FK Spartak Subotica players
Yugoslav First League players